The Years of Lyndon Johnson is a biography of Lyndon B. Johnson by the American writer Robert Caro. Four volumes have been published, running to more than 3,000 pages in total, detailing Johnson's early life, education, and political career. A fifth volume is expected to deal with the bulk of Johnson's presidency and post-presidential years. The series is published by Alfred A. Knopf.

Book One: The Path to Power (1982)
In the first volume, The Path to Power, Caro retraced Johnson's early life growing up in the Texas Hill Country and working in Washington, D.C. first as a congressional aide and then as a congressman.  Caro's research included renting a house in the Hill Country for three years, living there much of that time, to interview numerous people who knew Johnson and his family, and to better understand the environment in which Johnson had grown up.

This volume covers Johnson's life through his failed 1941 campaign for the United States Senate. This book was released on November 12, 1982. It won the 1982 National Book Critics Circle Award. It was a finalist for the 1983 National Book Award, hardcover autobiography or biography.

Book Two: Means of Ascent (1990)

In the second volume, Means of Ascent, Caro detailed Johnson's life from the aftermath of Johnson's first bid for the U.S. Senate in 1941 to his election to the Senate in 1948. Much of the book deals with Johnson's bitterly contested Democratic primary against Coke R. Stevenson in that year. The book was released on March 7, 1990.

Book Three: Master of the Senate (2002)
In the third volume, Master of the Senate, Caro chronicles Johnson's rapid ascent in United States Congress, including his tenure as Senate majority leader. This 1,167-page work examines in particular Johnson's battle to pass a landmark civil rights bill through Congress without it tearing apart his party, whose southern bloc was anti-civil rights while the northern faction was more supportive of civil rights. Although its scope was limited, the ensuing Civil Rights Act of 1957 was the first such legislation since the Reconstruction era.

The book was released on April 23, 2002. It won the 2003 Pulitzer Prize for Biography or Autobiography, the 2002 National Book Award for Nonfiction, the 2002 Los Angeles Times Book Prize for Biography, and the 2002 D.B. Hardeman Prize.

Book Four: The Passage of Power (2012)
In the fourth volume, The Passage of Power, Caro covers Johnson's life from 1958 to 1964, the challenges Johnson faced upon his assumption of the presidency, and the significant accomplishments in the months after Kennedy's assassination.

The 736-page book was released on May 1, 2012. It won the National Book Critics Circle Award (2012; Biography), the Los Angeles Times Book Prize (2012; Biography), the Mark Lynton History Prize (2013), the American History Book Prize (2013) and the Biographers International Organization's Plutarch Award (2013). It was a finalist for the National Book Award for Nonfiction (2012). It was selected as one of Time magazine's Best Books of the Year (non-fiction #2).

Book Five
In November 2011, Caro estimated that the fifth and final volume—expected to treat the remainder of Johnson's presidency and his life thereafter—would require another two to three years to write. In March 2013, he affirmed a commitment to completing the series with a fifth volume. As of April 2014, he was continuing to research the book. In a televised interview with C-SPAN in May 2017, Caro confirmed over 400 typed pages as being complete, covering the period 1964–65; and that once he completes the section on Johnson's 1965 legislative achievements, he intends to move to Vietnam to continue the writing process.

In an interview with the New York Review of Books in January 2018, Caro said that he was writing about 1965 and 1966 and a non-chronological section about the relationship between Johnson and Bobby Kennedy. Asked if he still planned to visit Vietnam soon, Caro replied: "Not yet, no. This is a very long book. And there's a lot to do before that's necessary. I'm getting close to it now." In December 2018, it was reported that Caro is still "several years from finishing" the volume. In January 2020, Caro said he had "typed 604 manuscript pages so far" and is "currently on a section relating to the creation of Medicare in 1965". Due to the impact of the COVID-19 pandemic in 2020, Caro postponed his research trip to Vietnam and a visit to the Johnson Presidential Library, but continued work on the book from his home in Manhattan. In October 2021, Caro said that he was writing about Johnson's passing of Medicare and his escalation of the Vietnam War.

Themes
Throughout the biography, Caro examines the acquisition and use of political power in American democracy, from the perspective both of those who wield it and those who are at its mercy. In an interview with Kurt Vonnegut and Daniel Stern, he once said: "I was never interested in writing biography just to show the life of a great man," saying he wanted instead "to use biography as a means of illuminating the times and the great forces that shape the times—particularly political power."

Caro's books portray Johnson as alternating between scheming opportunist and visionary progressive. Caro argues, for example, that Johnson's victory in the 1948 runoff for the Democratic nomination for the U.S. Senate was achieved through extensive fraud and ballot stuffing, just as Johnson had lost his 1941 Senate race because his opponent stuffed the ballot boxes more than Johnson. Caro also highlights some of Johnson's campaign contributions, such as those from the Texas construction firm Brown & Root; in 1962 the company was acquired by another Texas firm, Halliburton, which became a major contractor in the Vietnam War. Despite these criticisms, Caro's portrayal of Johnson also notes his struggles on behalf of progressive causes such as the Voting Rights Act of 1965.

Translation
There are plans for a Chinese translation of the series, collectively known under the title Lindeng Yuehanxun, published by Beijing-based Xiron Books. Chengdu resident He Yujia took four months to translate the first volume. She had not learned a significant amount of information about Lyndon Johnson in her formal education, and in accordance with her usual approach to translating non-fiction, she translated material as she read it instead of reading the entire work and then translating it. In late 2018, she spent four months translating the second volume, Jinjie zhi Ti ("Means of Ascent"), but as of 2020 the publisher still has not released the translation. Nor has He Yujia received financial remuneration for her work. Peter Hessler argued that this could be related to a decline in China-United States relations.

Influence of the series
Politicians have responded strongly to The Years of Lyndon Johnson:

Bill Clinton, a former President of the United States, wrote of The Passage of Power: "In sparkling detail, Caro shows the new president's genius for getting to people—friends, foes and everyone in between—and how he used it to achieve his goals."
Tom Daschle, a former Senate majority leader, once told the newspaper Roll Call after reading Master of the Senate that "I think the thing you learn from reading that magnificent book is that every day, this body makes history."
Walter Mondale, a former US vice president, described Master of the Senate as a "superb work of history."
Richard Nixon, a former President of the United States, called The Path To Power a "terrible book", expressing disbelief at its popularity and saying "it makes [Johnson] feel like a goddamn animal... because he was."
Gordon Brown, a former British prime minister, said of the series: "It's a wonderfully written set of books. The stories are quite breathtaking.... These books challenge the view of history that politics is just about individual maneuvering. It's about ideas and principled policy achievements. That's what makes it one of the great political biographies."
William Hague, a former British Conservative Party leader and foreign secretary, nominated Means of Ascent as the book he would most like to have with him on a desert island, in the BBC Radio 4 program Desert Island Discs. He later wrote: "I explained that it was the best political biography of any kind, that I had ever read. I said it conveyed more brilliantly than any other publication what it really feels like to be a politician.... When a fourth volume finally completes the set, this will be nothing short of a magnificent history of 20th century America."
 Michael Howard, another former Conservative Party leader, encountered the series after swapping houses with Caro for a holiday. He said, "For Caro, writing a biography is writing a thriller—in Johnson's case, a Western. You can't stop turning the pages. He doesn't like Johnson, but the facts are there so you can make your own judgments. I can't recommend this book highly enough."
 Beau Willimon, who created the American version of the political drama television series House of Cards, said he had drawn inspiration for the series from The Years of Lyndon Johnson. In the last episode of the first season, a copy of The Passage of Power can be seen lying on the desk of protagonist Frank Underwood.

See also

 All the Way – play

Bibliography
 Caro, Robert A., The Years of Lyndon Johnson: The Path to Power. 1982. Alfred a Knopf Inc., New York.. xxiii + 882 p. + 48 p. of plates: illus.
 Caro, Robert A., The Years of Lyndon Johnson: Means of Ascent. 1990. Alfred a Knopf Inc., New York.. xxxiv + 506 pp.
 Caro, Robert A., Master of the Senate: The Years of Lyndon Johnson. 2002. Alfred a Knopf Inc, New York.. xxiv + 1167 pp.
 Caro, Robert A., The Passage of Power: The Years of Lyndon Johnson. 2012. Alfred a Knopf Inc, New York.. 736 pp.

References

External links
Official website of Robert Caro
In Depth interview with Caro, April 7, 2002

1982 non-fiction books
1990 non-fiction books
2002 non-fiction books
American biographies
Biographies about politicians
Books about Lyndon B. Johnson
Pulitzer Prize for Biography or Autobiography-winning works
National Book Award for Nonfiction winning works
National Book Critics Circle Award-winning works
Multi-volume biographies
2012 non-fiction books
Book series introduced in 1982
Alfred A. Knopf books